Robert Gindre (3 April 1911 – 27 October 1991) was a French cross-country skier. He competed in the men's 18 kilometre event at the 1936 Winter Olympics.

References

1911 births
1991 deaths
French male cross-country skiers
Olympic cross-country skiers of France
Cross-country skiers at the 1936 Winter Olympics
Place of birth missing